Elizabeth Anne Caplan (born June 30, 1982) is an American actress. Her first acting role was on the television series Freaks and Geeks (1999–2000). She received wider recognition with roles in the films Mean Girls (2004) and Cloverfield (2008), she also starred on the television shows Related (2005–2006), The Class (2006–2007), and Party Down (2009–2010).

From 2013 to 2016, Caplan played Virginia E. Johnson on the Showtime series Masters of Sex, for which she received a nomination for the Primetime Emmy Award for Outstanding Lead Actress in a Drama Series. In 2019, she portrayed Annie Wilkes in the Hulu anthology series Castle Rock. Her other film appearances include Hot Tub Time Machine, 127 Hours (both 2010), Save the Date, Bachelorette (both 2012), The Interview (2014), Now You See Me 2, Allied (both 2016), and Extinction (2018). In 2022 she starred in FX on Hulu's Fleishman Is in Trouble (2022).

Early life
Elizabeth Anne Caplan was born on June 30, 1982, in Los Angeles, California, and grew up in its Miracle Mile district. Her family are Reform Jews of Ashkenazi Jewish descent. She had a Bat Mitzvah and attended Jewish summer camp. Her father, Richard Caplan, was a lawyer and her mother, Barbara (née Bragman), was a political aide. She is the youngest of three children with a brother, Benjamin, and a sister, Julie. Her mother died of cancer when she was 13 years old. Her uncle was publicist Howard Bragman. Caplan attended Alexander Hamilton High School, and attended the school's Academy of Music. She first focused on playing the piano, then later decided to pursue drama. She was also on her school's soccer team. She graduated in 2000, but did not attend college because she wanted to focus on acting.

Career

Caplan began her acting career in 1999, first playing a girl named Sara in the critically acclaimed series Freaks and Geeks. Due to her performance, her character became the girlfriend of Jason Segel's character. She then had a series of guest appearances on numerous shows, and appeared in Jason Mraz's music video "You and I Both". In 2000 she appeared in her first film From Where I Sit which was released straight to television. In 2001, she played Tina Greer in an episode of Smallville, and reprised her role on the show in 2003. She appeared in two episodes of the ABC series Once and Again. In 2003, she starred in the television series The Pitts, playing Faith Pitt. She gained wider notice for playing Janis Ian in the 2004 film Mean Girls. She played Avery Bishop in the second season of Tru Calling.

In 2005, Caplan played troubled sister Marjee Sorelli in Related, a one-hour comedy-drama on The WB that was canceled after one season. In 2006, she starred as Sara Weller in the thriller film Love is the Drug and was named one of "10 Actors to Watch" by Variety. After Related ended, Caplan was cast in the CBS sitcom The Class, which premiered in September 2006 and lasted for one season. She played Kat Warbler, one of several elementary school friends that reunite after 20 years.

In 2008, Caplan played Marlena Diamond in the film Cloverfield and was nominated for a Saturn Award for Best Supporting Actress. She also appeared as Ami in the romantic comedy My Best Friend's Girl. Later that year, she guest-starred as Amy Burley on the HBO vampire show True Blood. She was the voice of Faith Pitt in the proposed animated version of The Pitts, which was developed in 2007. She also appeared in the critically acclaimed Starz ensemble comedy Party Down, playing a struggling comedian who is part of a catering crew. In 2010, she appeared in 127 Hours.

In early 2012, Caplan premiered two films at the Sundance Film Festival: Save the Date and Bachelorette. Also in 2012, she appeared as Julia in several episodes of the Fox sitcom New Girl.

She played Agent Lacey in the 2014 film The Interview.

Masters of Sex (2013–2016)
In 2013, she began playing 1960s human sexuality pioneer Virginia E. Johnson on the Showtime series Masters of Sex. Caplan also provided her own vocals for a cover version of the song "You Don't Know Me" in the Masters of Sex episode "Phallic Victories". Her performance on the show was well-reviewed, and on July 10, 2014, she was nominated for the Primetime Emmy Award for Outstanding Lead Actress in a Drama Series.

Caplan was cast in her role as Johnson before they signed her co-star Michael Sheen as William H. Masters because he was busy working on another production. Producer Sarah Timberman said of Caplan, "The minute we met Lizzie we thought that she just embodied so much of the spirit of Virginia Johnson." Caplan also stated herself that as a single woman pursuing her career above a family, she identified with many of Johnson's characteristics. Once she met the producers, it took several months before Caplan was officially signed, and she turned down several other roles in the meantime.

Virginia Johnson had worked alongside William H. Masters as they completed research of human sexual response and sexual dysfunction beginning in the late 1950s. To learn about the characters they were portraying, Caplan along with her other co-stars read Thomas Maier's 2009 biography Masters of Sex. The author also allowed Caplan to listen to some of his interview tapes with Johnson. Caplan also attempted to spend some time with Johnson before she died in 2013, but Johnson was ambivalent about the development of the show. It was the first time Caplan portrayed a real person and she mentioned in an interview that she felt a "deep responsibility" to Johnson, but that she had some wiggle room because most people have no idea what Johnson looked or sounded like. Maier stated that the developers of the show have remained mostly accurate to his book and have included other events that are historically relevant to St. Louis, where the series takes place and where Masters and Johnson lived. Caplan has discussed becoming comfortable with the large number of sex scenes in Masters of Sex.

Her portrayal earned her nominations for the Primetime Emmy Award, Satellite Award and Critics' Choice Television Award, all for Outstanding Lead Actress.

Personal life
Caplan became engaged in May 2016 in New York to British actor Tom Riley. They had met in January 2015 while the actress was filming Now You See Me 2 in London, and made their red carpet debut as a couple at the Prague Opera Ball in February 2016. They married in September 2017. They have a son born in 2021.

Filmography

Film

Television

Awards and nominations

References

External links
 
 

1982 births
20th-century American actresses
21st-century American actresses
Actresses from Los Angeles
Alexander Hamilton High School (Los Angeles) alumni
American film actresses
American television actresses
Jewish American actresses
Living people
American Reform Jews
21st-century American Jews